The 26th Lumières Awards ceremony, presented by the Académie des Lumières, took place on 19 January 2021 to honour the best in French-speaking cinema of 2020. The show was hosted by French journalists Laurie Cholewa and Laurent Weil. Canal+ broadcast the ceremony.

Love Affair(s) won the Best Film. The ceremony paid tribute to Spanish journalist and a Lumières long-standing member, José María Riba.

Winners and nominees
The nominations were announced on 14 December 2020. Winners are listed first, highlighted in boldface, and indicated with a double dagger.

Films with multiple nominations and awards

See also
46th César Awards

References

External links
 

Lumières
Lumières
Lumières Awards
Lumières Awards
Lumières Awards